Elinor W. Gadon (September 17, 1925 – May 8, 2018) is an American cultural historian, Indologist, art historian and author notable for her examination of women in myth and culture in history.

Career
Gadon has taught at several educational institutions, including the Harvard Divinity School and Tufts University, where she was an associate scholar in the Women's Leadership Program. At the California Institute of Integral Studies in San Francisco, she developed and directed a course in women's spirituality. In 2006, she became a resident scholar at Brandeis University's Women's Studies Research Center Scholars Program in Waltham, Massachusetts.

Gadon's research has focused on the analysis of myth and imagery within their specific cultural contexts and how they affect issues of gender. In part due to her major publication, The Once and Future Goddess, she has been compared to other "scholars of the goddess" such as Marija Gimbutas and others associated with the Goddess movement.

Indian art history has been a particular area of interest for Gadon.

Spirituality

Gadon is a proponent of female spirituality, and argued that western-oriented religions have a dearth of female-oriented imagery and symbolism, in contrast to Eastern religions such as Hinduism.

Selected publications

Awards
 Women's Caucus for Art Lifetime Achievement Award, 2006.

References

External links
 Biography

1925 births
2018 deaths
Harvard Divinity School faculty
Tufts University faculty
Brandeis University faculty
21st-century American historians
American social sciences writers
American women historians
University of Michigan College of Literature, Science, and the Arts alumni
21st-century American women